Deonandan Prasad Yadava is an Indian politician from the state of Bihar.

He was elected in Indian general elections held in 1984 for the 8th Lok Sabha from the Monghyr He was 3 times MP from munger. He was former EDUCATION MINISTER and president of Central school organisation. seat in the state of Bihar.

References

India MPs 1984–1989
Living people
People from Munger district
Lok Sabha members from Bihar
Year of birth missing (living people)